Brand New World, also called Woundings, a UK film based on Jeff Noon's play Woundings and released in 1998. It was filmed in Cregneash, Isle of Man,

The director Roberta Hanley won the Grand Jury Prize for Best Feature Film at the 2001 New York International Independent Film and Video Festival for the film.

External links

British science fiction films
1990s English-language films
1998 films
1990s British films